Petrofani is an abandoned village in central Cyprus.  It is located in the Larnaca District and is about 2.5 kilometers southwest of Athienou.  Petrofani is close to the United Nations Buffer Zone in Cyprus. Prior to the 1974 Turkish invasion of Cyprus, the village was inhabited by Turkish Cypriots.

References

Communities in Larnaca District
Former populated places in Cyprus
Turkish Cypriot villages depopulated after the 1974 Turkish invasion of Cyprus